The 1975–76 season was Liverpool Football Club's 84th season in existence and their 14th consecutive season in the First Division. Liverpool won its ninth Football League title and second UEFA Cup, which were the first trophies won under manager Bob Paisley, in his second season as manager.

Paisley saw his team clinch the league title narrowly ahead of contenders Queens Park Rangers. In a climax to the season, Liverpool needed to either win or secure a low-scoring draw against relegation-threatened Wolverhampton Wanderers.  With 14 minutes left for play and despite constant pressure in the second half, the Reds trailed to a Steve Kindon strike for Wolves. The title was slipping away from Liverpool but three late goals from Kevin Keegan, John Toshack and Ray Kennedy in front of away support ensured Liverpool's ninth title and Bob Paisley's first trophy.

In the UEFA Cup, Liverpool overcame Barcelona in the semi-finals, to set up a final with Club Brugge. Liverpool won the first leg 3–2 on 28 April after being two-nil down in the first half. Three weeks later, a 1–1 draw in Olympiastadion, Bruges, saw them lift the cup for the second time.

The emergence of Phil Neal, Phil Thompson and Ray Kennedy in the Liverpool side saw them make their England debuts in the Welsh FA Centenary International against Wales on 24 March 1976.  Also in the England side were Ray Clemence and, captaining England for the first time, Kevin Keegan, and those five would go on to play for England for many years to come.

Squad

Goalkeepers
  Ray Clemence
  Frank Lane
  Peter McDonnell

Defenders
  Emlyn Hughes
  Joey Jones
  Brian Kettle
  Chris Lawler
  Alec Lindsay
  John McLaughlin
  Phil Neal
  Tommy Smith
  Max Thompson
  Phil Thompson

Midfielders
  Ian Callaghan
  Jimmy Case
  Peter Cormack
  Brian Hall
  Steve Heighway
  Ray Kennedy
  Terry McDermott

Attackers
  Phil Boersma
  David Fairclough
  Kevin Keegan
  Kevin Kewley
  John Toshack
  Alan Waddle

League table

Results

First Division

Football League Cup

FA Cup

UEFA Cup

Final

First Leg

Second Leg

References

 LFC History.net – 1975–76 season
 Liverweb - 1975-76 Season

Liverpool F.C. seasons
Liverpool
English football championship-winning seasons
UEFA Europa League-winning seasons